The winding cisticola (Cisticola marginatus) is a species of bird in the family Cisticolidae. It has a scattered distribution across Africa south of the Sahara, and north of 11°S.

Taxonomy
The winding cisticola has several subspecies:
 C. m. amphilectus Reichenow, 1875 Mauritania and Senegal to Ghana, south-western Cameroon and north-western Angola
 C. m. zalingei Lynes, 1930 northern Nigeria to western Sudan
 C. m. marginatus (Heuglin, 1869) southern Sudan and northern Uganda
 C. m. nyansae Neumann, 1905 central DRCongo to Uganda and Kenya
 C. m. suahelicus Neumann, 1905 south-eastern DRCongo, Tanzania and north-eastern Zambia

The Clements list (2017) and the Howard and Moore list (2014) lump the rufous-winged cisticola, Luapula cisticola, coastal cisticola and Ethiopian cisticola with the above subspecies as the winding cisticola Cisticola galactotes (sensu lato). The Clements list (2017) recognizes 11 subspecies.

Habitat

Its natural habitats are tropical seasonally wet or flooded lowland grassland and swamps.

Gallery

References

External links

winding cisticola
Birds of Sub-Saharan Africa
winding cisticola
Taxonomy articles created by Polbot